Paenisporosarcina antarctica is a psychrophilic, Gram-positive and rod-shaped bacterium from the genus of Paenisporosarcina which has been isolated from soil from the King George Island.

References 

Bacillales
Bacteria described in 2008